Denmark Casey Jr. is Belizean footballer who currently plays for Verdes in the Premier League of Belize and the Belize national team.

International career 
Casey Jr. made his national team debut for Belize on 4 September 2014 in a 2–0 loss against Honduras.

International goals
Scores and results list Belize's goal tally first.

References 

1994 births
Living people
Belizean footballers
Belize international footballers
Premier League of Belize players
Association football midfielders
Belmopan Bandits players
Verdes FC players
Belize Defence Force FC players